Manchester Dock and similar can mean:
"Manchester Docks" is another name for Salford Docks in Greater Manchester, England
Manchester Dock (Liverpool), an old dock (now filled in) in Liverpool, England
Manchester Dock, a dock in Richmond, Virginia, United States